Martin Johansson (born March 18, 1977 in Ängelholm, Sweden) is a Swedish professional ice hockey left winger currently playing for Jonstorps IF in the Swedish 2nd Division.

Johansson began his career for Rögle BK and also had spells with IK Pantern, Tingsryd AIF, Nybro Vikings and IF Nyköping before returning to Rögle in 2006.  He helped the team reach Elitserien in 2008 but was not signed again for the 2008 winter season and instead signed for Jonstorps.

He lives in Ängelholm with his wife and two kids.

References

External links

1977 births
Swedish ice hockey left wingers
Living people
Nyköpings Hockey players
Rögle BK players
Nybro Vikings players
Tingsryds AIF players
People from Ängelholm Municipality